The men's 1000 meter at the 2014 KNSB Dutch Single Distance Championships took place in Heerenveen at the Thialf ice skating rink on Sunday 27 October 2013. Although this tournament was held in 2013 it was part of the speed skating season 2013–2014. There were 24 participants.

Statistics

Result

Source:

Draw

References

Single Distance Championships
2014 Single Distance